Mark Weightman Bauerlein (born 1959) is an English professor emeritus at Emory University and a senior editor of First Things. He  also serves as a visitor of Ralston College, a start-up liberal arts college in Savannah.

Early life and education
Bauerlein earned his doctorate in English from UCLA in 1988, having completed a thesis on poet Walt Whitman under the supervision of Joseph N. Riddel.

Career
Bauerlein is a Professor Emeritus of English who taught at Emory University from 1989 to 2018, with a brief break between 2003 and 2005 to work at the National Endowment for the Arts, serving as the director of the Office of Research and Analysis. While there, Bauerlein contributed to an NEA study, "Reading at Risk: A Survey of Literary Reading in America". In 2023, he was appointed by Ron DeSantis to the New College of Florida Board of Trustees.

Beliefs concerning DEI in colleges 
Bauerlein has said he strongly opposes implementing diversity, equity, and inclusion (DEI) in colleges.

“I urge, and I’ve written this, that all DEI initiatives be eliminated from higher education, that DEI offices be absolutely closed, shut down,” Bauerlein said. “They lead students to develop bad ideas.”

According to Bauerlein, when DEI is incorporated into academia, the peer review process becomes corrupted.

“When you start saying, ‘Oh, we need to publish more writers who are not white men,’ the process has been corrupted,” Bauerlein said. “Right off the bat, standards go down. Peer review becomes politicized. This is the beginning of the fall of a discipline, and I’ve seen it happen many, many times.”

Published Works
Bauerlein's books include Literary Criticism: An Autopsy (1997) and The Pragmatic Mind: Explorations in the Psychology of Belief (1997). He is also the author of the 2008 book The Dumbest Generation: How the Digital Age Stupefies Young Americans and Jeopardizes Our Future (Or, Don't Trust Anyone Under 30), which won the Nautilus Award.

Bauerlein explains how his experience as a teacher led to his writing of The Dumbest Generation:

Apart from his scholarly work, he publishes in popular publications such as The Federalist, Chronicle of Higher Education, The Washington Post, The Wall Street Journal, The Weekly Standard and The Times Literary Supplement.

In 2022, Bauerlein published a sequel to The Dumbest Generation titled The Dumbest Generation Grows Up: From Stupefied Youth To Dangerous Adults.

Personal life
In 2012, Bauerlein announced his conversion to Catholicism. He has described himself as an "educational conservative,” while he socially and politically identifies as being "pretty ... libertarian", according to an interview conducted by Reason magazine. He endorsed Donald Trump in the 2016 U.S. presidential election. Bauerlein has an identical twin brother.

List of works
 .
 .
 .
 .

See also
Aliteracy

References

External links

 .
 .
 
 
 .

1959 births
Living people
American academics of English literature
American male non-fiction writers
Converts to Roman Catholicism from atheism or agnosticism
American Roman Catholics
Emory University faculty
National Endowment for the Arts
University of California, Los Angeles alumni